Kyle J. Tasker (born June 6, 1985) is an American politician who served in the New Hampshire House of Representatives. He courted controversy a number of times while in office, including an incident where he dropped a gun during a committee meeting and one where he joked on Facebook about domestic violence. In 2016, during his third term, he was arrested on drug possession and sex crime charges and resigned a few days later. It was later reported by the New Hampshire Attorney General's office that he sold marijuana to a number of his fellow lawmakers. While released on bail, he was involved in a car accident and was rearrested for driving under the influence.

References

External links

Living people
1985 births
People from Nottingham, New Hampshire
Republican Party members of the New Hampshire House of Representatives
21st-century American politicians